Wei Rongjue (born September 4, 1916) was a Chinese physicist and professor at Nanjing University. In 1952, he was appointed chairman of the physics department at Nanjing University.

He's a member of the Chinese Academy of Science.

Early life and education
Wei was born in Shaoyang, Hunan, on September 4, 1916. He obtained a bachelor's degree in physics in 1936 from the University of Nanking, a master's degree in 1947 from Nanjing University, and a doctorate degree in physics from the University of Illinois in 1950.

References

1916 births
20th-century Chinese physicists
Members of the Chinese Academy of Sciences
Academic staff of Nanjing University
People from Shaoyang